Cisthene faustinula is a moth of the family Erebidae. It was described by Jean Baptiste Boisduval in 1869. It is found in California.

The length of the forewings 9–11 mm. Adults have been recorded on wing from July to September.

References

Cisthenina
Moths described in 1869